This is a partial list of former theatres in London.

Former theatres in London

English Renaissance theatres

This covers the period from the establishment of the first Tudor playhouses, through to their closure by Parliament at the beginning of the English Civil War in 1642.

Post Renaissance former London theatres

Alhambra Theatre
Astoria Theatre
Bolton's Theatre Club
Britannia Theatre
The Bunker, Southwark
Camden Theatre
Cockpit Theatre
Coronet Theatre
Daly's Theatre
Dorset Garden Theatre
Empire Theatre of Varieties
Empress Theatre (Brixton)
Everyman Theatre, Hampstead
Folly Theatre later Toole's Theatre
Gaiety Theatre, London
Garrick Theatre (Leman St)
Gate Theatre Studio
Gibbon's Tennis Court
Globe Theatre (Newcastle Street)
Golders Green Hippodrome
Goodman's Fields Theatre
Half Moon Theatre
Hippodrome, London
Holborn Theatre
Lisle's Tennis Court
London Opera House
London Pavilion
Novelty Theatre
Olympic Theatre
Open Space Theatre
Opera Comique
Original Shaftesbury Theatre
Q Theatre
Queen's Theatre, Long Acre
Players' Theatre
Princess's Theatre, London
Royal Aquarium
Royal Strand Theatre
Royalty Theatre
Rutland House
Sans Souci Theatre
Saville Theatre
Scala Theatre
St George's Hall
St James's Theatre
Stoll Theatre
Surrey Theatre
Terry's Theatre
Theatre Royal, Marylebone
Unity Theatre
Westminster Theatre
Windmill Theatre

Former music halls

Apollo Saloon
Canterbury Music Hall
Charing Cross Music Hall
Evans Music-and-Supper Rooms
Golders Green Hippodrome
London Hippodrome
London Pavilion
Middlesex Music Hall, the Old Mo'
Oxford Music Hall
Strand Musick Hall
Surrey Theatre
Weston's Music Hall (later, the Holborn Empire)
Wilton's Music Hall

See also
List of London venues

Further reading

External links
 

 
Entertainment in London
Performing arts in London
Theatre
Theatres, London
London, former
Theatres